Alice and Bob are fictional characters commonly used as placeholders in discussions about cryptographic systems and protocols, and in other science and engineering literature where there are several participants in a thought experiment. The Alice and Bob characters were invented by Ron Rivest, Adi Shamir, and Leonard Adleman in their 1978 paper "A Method for Obtaining Digital Signatures and Public-key Cryptosystems". Subsequently, they have become common archetypes in many scientific and engineering fields, such as quantum cryptography, game theory and physics. As the use of Alice and Bob became more widespread, additional characters were added, sometimes each with a particular meaning. These characters do not have to refer to people; they refer to generic agents which might be different computers or even different programs running on a single computer.

Overview 

Alice and Bob are the names of fictional characters used for convenience and to aid comprehension. For example, "How can Bob send a private message M to Alice in a public-key cryptosystem?" is believed to be easier to describe and understand than if the hypothetical people were simply named A and B as in "How can B send a private message M to A in a public-key cryptosystem?"

The names are conventional, and where relevant may use an alliterative mnemonic to associate the name with the typical role of that person.

History 
Scientific papers about thought experiments with several participants often used letters to identify them, A, B, and C, etc.

The first mention of Alice and Bob in the context of cryptography was in Rivest, Shamir, and Adleman's 1978 article "A method for obtaining digital signatures and public-key cryptosystems." They wrote, "For our scenarios we suppose that A and B (also known as Alice and Bob) are two users of a public-key cryptosystem". Previous to this article, cryptographers typically referred to message senders and receivers as A and B, or other simple symbols. In fact, in the two previous articles by Rivest, Shamir, and Adleman, introducing the RSA cryptosystem, there is no mention of Alice and Bob. Possibly the choice of the first three names came from the film Bob & Carol & Ted & Alice.

Within a few years, however, references to Alice and Bob in cryptological literature became a common trope. Cryptographers would often begin their academic papers with reference to Alice and Bob. For instance, Michael Rabin began his 1981 paper, "Bob and Alice each have a secret, SB and SA, respectively, which they want to exchange." Early on, Alice and Bob were starting to appear in other domains, such as in Manuel Blum's 1981 article, "Coin Flipping by Telephone: A Protocol for Solving Impossible Problems," which begins, "Alice and Bob want to flip a coin by telephone."

Although Alice and Bob were invented with no reference to their personality, authors soon began adding colorful descriptions. In 1983, Blum invented a backstory about a troubled relationship between Alice and Bob, writing, "Alice and Bob, recently divorced, mutually distrustful, still do business together. They live on opposite coasts, communicate mainly by telephone, and use their computers to transact business over the telephone." In 1984, John Gordon delivered his famous "After Dinner Speech" about Alice and Bob, which he imagines to be the first "definitive biography of Alice and Bob."

In addition to adding backstories and personalities to Alice and Bob, authors soon added other characters, with their own personalities. The first to be added was Eve, the "eavesdropper." Eve was invented in 1988 by Charles Bennet, Gilles Brassard, and Jean-Marc Robert, in their paper, "Privacy Amplification by Public Discussion." In Bruce Schneier's book Applied Cryptography, other characters are listed.

Cast of characters
The most common characters are Alice and Bob. Eve, Mallory, and Trent are also common names, and have fairly well-established "personalities" (or functions). The names often use alliterative mnemonics (for example, Eve, "eavesdropper"; Mallory, "malicious") where different players have different motives. Other names are much less common and more flexible in use. Sometimes the genders are alternated: Alice, Bob, Carol, Dave, Eve, etc.

For interactive proof systems there are other characters:

Physics 
The names Alice and Bob are also often used to name the participants in thought experiments in physics. More alphabetical names are used as required, e.g. "Alice and Bob (and Carol and Dick and Eve)".

See also 
 Diffie–Hellman key exchange
 Martin Gardner
 Public-key cryptography
 Security protocol notation

References

External links
 History of Alice and Bob
 A Method for Obtaining Digital Signatures and Public-Key Cryptosystems
 The Alice and Bob After-Dinner Speech, given at the Zurich Seminar, April 1984, by John Gordon
 Geek Song: "Alice and Bob"
 Alice and Bob jokes (mainly Quantum Computing-related)
 A short history of Bobs (story and slideshow) in the computing industry, from Alice & Bob to Microsoft Bob and Father of Ethernet Bob Metcalfe
 XKCD #177: Alice and Bob

Cryptographic protocols
Placeholder names
Thought experiments in physics
Fictional duos
History of computing